The 15:17 to Paris is a 2018 American biographical drama film produced and directed by Clint Eastwood and written by Dorothy Blyskal, based on the 2016 autobiography The 15:17 to Paris: The True Story of a Terrorist, a Train, and Three American Heroes by Jeffrey E. Stern, Spencer Stone, Anthony Sadler, and Alek Skarlatos. The film stars Stone, Sadler, and Skarlatos as themselves and follows the trio through life leading up to and including their stopping of the 2015 Thalys train attack.  Judy Greer and Jenna Fischer also star.

Eastwood's intention to adapt the autobiography into a film was announced in April 2017, from a screenplay by Blyskal, a first-time screenwriter. Though professional actors such as Kyle Gallner and Jeremie Harris were considered, Eastwood decided by July to instead cast the real-life participants of the event, and filming began in the same month.

The 15:17 to Paris was released in the United States on February 9, 2018, by Warner Bros. Pictures. It received  negative reviews from critics, who faulted the screenplay and unengaging story before the climax, and the acting from the lead actors, while the central train sequences were generally praised. The film grossed $57 million worldwide against a production budget of $30 million.

Plot

Spencer Stone and Alek Skarlatos are attending a suburban Christian middle school. They bond over their interest in guns, and are often sent to the principal's office for disciplinary action. Once, while sent to the principal's office, they meet another student, who often misbehaves in school, Anthony Sadler, and the three become friends. Spencer and Alek are from single-mother homes, and their mothers often stick up for them when called to the principal's office regarding their misconduct.

While working part time at a smoothie shop, Spencer waits on a recruiter for the United States Marine Corps. He asks the recruiter what military branch he would select if he could go back. The recruiter replies that the Air Force pararescue save lives and "seem to being doing fine work in the field." Spencer is intrigued and decides that he wants to join up, so he begins working out to lose weight. After several months of rigorous training and exercise, he gets into better shape and enlists in the Air Force in hopes of becoming a Pararescueman.

Upon completing basic training, Spencer takes his exams to qualify for pararescue school but is turned down due to having poor depth perception. Upset, he chooses from the other Air Force options left to him, and is soon stationed abroad. Alek enlisted in the National Guard, and has been deployed to Afghanistan. On Skype, Alek tells him that he is planning to visit his girlfriend in Germany, and the two decide to rendezvous there for their next leave. Spencer skypes Anthony, now a college student, and talks him into coming to Europe for a vacation, starting in Italy. Next, the three meet in Germany and decide to go to Amsterdam. After a few days there, they finally decide to visit France. They depart from Amsterdam Centraal station on the 15:17 train to Paris.

On the train, all seems well, until American-born Frenchman Mark Moogalian notices that one of the toilets has been occupied for an unusually long time. When he goes to investigate, a terrorist bursts out with an assault rifle. Another passenger, Damien A., grabs the terrorist by the neck and Moogalian manages to wrest the rifle from the terrorist but is then shot in the back with a 9mm pistol. Passengers begin to flee out of their seats and rush toward the forward cabins of the train, trying to escape. Eventually, the terrorist approaches the next car, where Spencer and his friends are sitting. The moment Spencer sees him, he springs into action. He decides that his only hope, and the only hope of the remaining passengers, is for him to try to defeat the terrorist. Spencer makes a desperate all-out sprint toward the terrorist in the hope of subduing him before being shot. By remarkable luck, the terrorist's weapon jams just as he is about to fire, and Spencer tackles and disarms him. Seeing Spencer's progress in subduing the terrorist, Alek, Anthony, and other passengers join the effort to try to overwhelm the terrorist. Spencer finally knocks him out by putting him in a choke hold. Spencer then stanches the bleeding by plugging the exit wound in Moogalian's neck with his fingers. The police at the next station enter the train fully armed, discovering that Spencer has subdued the terrorist, and the paramedics begin to treat his wounds and the more serious ones of the shot passenger. Paramedics take Moogalian to the emergency room at a local hospital and he survives.

In a formal ceremony, Spencer, Alek and Anthony are recognized as heroes of France for their gallantry and bravery by the President François Hollande, who tells the public that the terrorist was armed with over 300 rounds of ammunition with the apparent aim of using all of it to wreak havoc on all those who boarded the train. The odds of the particular misfire and jam of the cartridge in the terrorist's weapon was estimated on the scene as being less than one out of a thousand, and highly unlikely to have been in Spencer's favor. French officials at the ceremony acknowledge their bravery and award them the French Legion of Honour in recognition of their act of courage. The film ends with a parade in honour of the three friends in the town they grew up in, Sacramento.

Cast

 Spencer Stone as himself
 Anthony Sadler as himself
 Alek Skarlatos as himself
 Mark Moogalian as himself
 Isabelle Risacher Moogalian as herself
 Judy Greer as Joyce Eskel, Spencer’s Mother
 Jenna Fischer as Heidi Skarlatos, Alek’s Mother
 Ray Corasani as Ayoub El-Khazzani
 Chris Norman as himself
 P.J. Byrne as Mr. Henry
 Sinqua Walls as Marine
 Ethan Rains as Ben Zomerdyk
 Tony Hale as Coach Murray
 Thomas Lennon as Principal Michael Akers
 Jaleel White as Garrett Walden

Additionally, Paul-Mikel Williams, Max Ivutin, Bryce Gheisar, Cole Eichenberger, and William Jennings portray younger versions of Stone, Sadler, and Skarlatos.

Production
On April 20, 2017, it was announced that Clint Eastwood would next direct The 15:17 to Paris from a screenplay by newcomer screenwriter Dorothy Blyskal based on the book The 15:17 to Paris: The True Story of a Terrorist, a Train, and Three American Heroes. It was announced that Eastwood would begin casting immediately for a principal production start date of later that year. On June 21, 2017, it was announced that Eastwood had chosen Kyle Gallner, Jeremie Harris and Alexander Ludwig to star as Alek Skarlatos, Anthony Sadler and Spencer Stone although offers had not yet been made.

On July 11, 2017, it was announced that Eastwood had cast Sadler, Skarlatos and Stone as themselves in the film which will "begin during their childhood and show their friendship leading up to the moment that changed their lives". It was also announced that the film had commenced principal production. On July 13, 2017, Tony Hale and Thomas Lennon joined the cast as staff members of a school the lead three men attended as children. On August 1, 2017, Sinqua Walls was cast in the film for an unspecified role. Mark Moogalian and Isabelle Risacher Moogalian were also cast as themselves in the film. Eastwood finished shooting in Atlanta, Georgia on August 2, 2017.

The film's release date of February 9, 2018 was announced by Warner Bros. on October 24, 2017.

Release
The film was released in the United States on February 9, 2018. The film was originally rated R by the MPAA for "a sequence of violence and bloody images", but received a PG-13 rating upon appeal.

Marketing
The trailer for the film was released on December 13, 2017, two months before the film's general release.

Home media
The 15:17 to Paris was released on HD digital copies on May 1, 2018. The film was then released on Blu-ray and DVD on May 22, 2018.

Reception

Box office
The 15:17 to Paris grossed $36.3 million in the United States and Canada, and $20.6 million in other territories, for a worldwide total of $56.9 million, against a production budget of $30 million.

In the United States and Canada, the film was released alongside Peter Rabbit and Fifty Shades Freed, and was projected to gross $10–15 million from 3,042 theaters in its opening weekend. It ended up making $12.6 million, finishing third at the box office behind its two fellow releases. The film dropped 40% in its second weekend to $7.6 million ($8.9 million over the four-day Presidents Day weekend), finishing fifth.

Critical response
The website's critical consensus reads, "The 15:17 to Paris pays clumsily well-intentioned tribute to an act of heroism, but by casting the real-life individuals involved, director Clint Eastwood fatally derails his own efforts." On Metacritic, the film has a weighted average score of 45 out of 100, based on 36 critics, indicating "mixed or average reviews". Audiences polled by CinemaScore gave the film an average grade of "B−" on an A+ to F scale.

Kevin P. Sullivan of Entertainment Weekly gave the film a grade of D, praising the train attack scene as "thrillingly shot and edited" while criticizing the entire lead-up to it as filler. Sullivan emphasized that "The entire script is replete with [clunky and unsubtle] dialogue... doing no favors for the inexperienced actors." Matt Zoller Seitz of RogerEbert.com gave the film two out of four stars, stating that "[a] good 70% of [The 15:17 to Paris] is inert, its affable nothingness redeemed only by the laid-back charisma of three men", although he praised the film's "poker-faced sincerity" and the "superb" climactic train scene. A. O. Scott of The New York Times gave the film a positive review and wrote, "[Eastwood's] workmanlike absorption in the task at hand is precisely what makes this movie fascinating as well as moving. Its radical plainness is tinged with mystery."

References

External links

The 15:17 to Paris at History vs. Hollywood

2015 Thalys train attack
2018 films
2018 biographical drama films
American drama films
American biographical drama films
Crime films based on actual events
Drama films based on actual events
Dune Entertainment films
2010s English-language films
Films about terrorism in Europe
Films directed by Clint Eastwood
Films set in 2005
Films set in 2015
Films set in Amsterdam
Films set in Paris
Films set on trains
Films shot in Atlanta
Films shot in Brussels
Films shot in the Netherlands
Films shot in Paris
Films shot in Rome
Films shot in Venice
Malpaso Productions films
Thriller films based on actual events
Village Roadshow Pictures films
Warner Bros. films
2018 drama films
2010s American films